Torrecilla Alta is a barrio in the municipality of Loíza, Puerto Rico. Its population in 2010 was 0.

History
Puerto Rico was ceded by Spain in the aftermath of the Spanish–American War under the terms of the Treaty of Paris of 1898 and became an unincorporated territory of the United States. In 1899, the United States Department of War conducted a census of Puerto Rico finding that the combined population of Torrecilla Alta  and Torrecilla Baja barrios was 1,473.

Features
Torrecilla Alta in Loíza shares a border with Torrecillas Alta in Canóvanas, a neighboring municipality. Both are near mangroves and the Río Grande de Loíza. Alligators are known to roam the areas near the mangroves and when discovered, the creatures are moved to a location managed by the Department of Resources.

See also

 List of communities in Puerto Rico
 List of barrios and sectors of Loíza, Puerto Rico

References

Barrios of Loíza, Puerto Rico